Kentaro Moriya (森谷 賢太郎, born 21 September 1988) is a Japanese football player who plays for Sagan Tosu. He was born in Kōnan-ku, Yokohama, Japan.

Club statistics
Updated to 19 July 2022.

References

External links
Profile at Kawasaki Frontale

1988 births
Living people
University of Tsukuba alumni
Association football people from Kanagawa Prefecture
Japanese footballers
J1 League players
J2 League players
Yokohama F. Marinos players
Kawasaki Frontale players
Júbilo Iwata players
Ehime FC players
Sagan Tosu players
Association football midfielders